Lepidopteris callipteroides is a form species for leaves of Late Permian Pteridospermatophyta, or seed ferns, which lived from around 252 million years ago in what is now Australia, and Madagascar. Lepidopteris callipteroides was an immediate survivor of the largest Permian-Triassic extinction event, migrating southward with the post-apocalyptic greenhouse spike.

Description 

In the form generic system of paleobotany Lepidopteris is used only for leaves, which in Lepidopteris callipteroides is palmate with multiple dichotomies of the rachis. The cuticle of the leaves is thick and has distinctive cuticular structure with stomatal opening overhung by papillae, used to link the fossil leaves with well preserved ovulate structures of Peltaspermum townrovii and pollen organs of Permotheca helbyi in the same deposits

Atmospheric carbon dioxide paleobarometer 

The cuticular structure of Lepidopteris callipteroides is comparable to that of modern Ginkgo, and has been used to estimate past atmospheric carbon dioxide of an astounding 7832 ppm from its stomatal index immediately following the largest Permian-Triassic extinction event.

References

External links 

Permian plants
Triassic plants
Pteridospermatophyta
Permian first appearances
Triassic extinctions